Biurakn Hakhverdian (born 4 October 1985 in Leiden) is a Dutch water polo player who represents the Dutch national team in international competitions. She is of Iranian Armenian descent.

Life 
Hakhverdian was born in Leiden, where she began her water polo career playing for ZVL Leiden. In 2000, she rose to national level as she was selected for the national Dutch junior women's team. Two years later, she became the captain of the Dutch national junior women's team.

Since 2004, she has been playing for the Dutch national senior women's team. In 2005, Hakhverdian stopped playing for ZVL and signed a contract with Ethnikos Piraeus (Athens, Greece), but returned within three months after internal mismanagement. Upon her return to the Netherlands, Hakhverdian signed a contract with Polar Bears. In 2012, she returned to ZVL and she finished her waterpolo career in 2013 after the World Championship in Barcelona.

Hakhverdian was part of the Dutch team that finished 10th at the 2005 World Aquatics Championships in Montreal. At the 2006 FINA Women's Water Polo World League in Cosenza and the 2006 Women's European Water Polo Championship in Belgrade they finished in 5th place, followed by the 9th spot at the 2007 World Aquatics Championships in Melbourne, and 5th at the 2009 World Aquatics Championships. The Dutch team finished in fifth place at the 2008 Women's European Water Polo Championship in Málaga and they qualified for the 2008 Summer Olympics in Beijing. There they won the gold medal on 21 August, beating the United States 9-8 in the final. In Barcelona at the 2013 World Aquatics Championships the team lost in the quarter finals.

See also
 Netherlands women's Olympic water polo team records and statistics
 List of Olympic champions in women's water polo
 List of Olympic medalists in water polo (women)
 List of World Aquatics Championships medalists in water polo

References

External links
 

1985 births
Living people
Dutch people of Armenian descent
Dutch people of Iranian descent
Sportspeople from Leiden
Dutch female water polo players
Water polo drivers
Water polo players at the 2008 Summer Olympics
Medalists at the 2008 Summer Olympics
Olympic gold medalists for the Netherlands in water polo